Nixon Alexander Restrepo Mena (born 28 December 1993) is a Colombian professional footballer.

References

External links 
Nixon Restrepo at playmakerstats.com (English version of ceroacero.es)

1993 births
Living people
Colombian footballers
Águilas Doradas Rionegro players
C.D. Juventud Independiente players
Colombian expatriate footballers
Expatriate footballers in El Salvador
Association football defenders